The 2011 New Forest District Council election took place on 5 May 2011 to elect members to the New Forest District Council, on the same day as other local elections. The election saw the Conservatives gain eight seats from the Liberal Democrats, increasing their majority.

Election Summary 
After the 2007 elections, the Conservatives held 45 seats, the Liberal Democrats held 14, and one seat was Independent; Prior to this election, Independent Councillor Danny Cracknell died, with the Conservatives winning a subsequent by-election, meaning that the Conservatives held 46 seats and Liberal Democrats held 14.

The Conservatives again increased their control of the council, winning 54 seats out of 60, with the Liberal Democrats holding the remaining six.

Note that comparisons to the previous election do not include Bramshaw, Copythorne North and Minstead, as a by-election was held several months later instead.

The table below only tallies the votes of the highest polling candidate for each party within each ward. This is known as the top candidate method and is often used for multi-member plurality elections.

Ward Results

Ashurst, Copythorne South and Netley Marsh

Barton

Bashley

Becton

Boldre and Sway

Bramshaw, Copythrone North and Minstead

Bransgore and Burley

Brockenhurst and Forest South East

Buckland

Butts Ash and Dibden Purlieu

Dibden and Hythe East

Downlands and Forest

Fawley, Blackfield and Langley

Fernhill

Fordingbridge

Forest North West

Furzedown and Hardley

Holbury and North Blackfield

Hordle

Hythe West and Langdown

Lymington Town

Lyndhurst

Marchwood

Milford

Milton

Pennington

Ringwood East and Sopley

Ringwood North

Ringwood South

Totton Central

Totton East

Totton North

Totton South

Totton West

References 

2011 English local elections
New Forest District Council elections
2010s in Hampshire